Zanhuang County is a county in the southwestern Hebei Province, North China, bordering Shanxi province to the west. It is under the administration of the prefecture-level city of Shijiazhuang, the provincial capital.

Administrative divisions
Towns:
Zanhuang Town, Yuantou

Townships:
Nanxingguo Township, Nanqinghe Township, Xiyangze Township, Huangbeiping Township, Xuting Township, Zhangshiyan Township, Zhangleng Township, Xilongmen Township, Tumen Township

Climate

References

County-level divisions of Hebei
Shijiazhuang